Our World is an American television news program that aired on ABC for 26 episodes, from September 25, 1986 to May 28, 1987. The show was anchored by Linda Ellerbee and Ray Gandolf. Each episode of the program examined, through the use of archival film and television footage, one short period in American history.

Our World grew out of an earlier ABC News special called 45/85, whose producer, Avram Westin, would go on to produce Our World. Each episode was produced on a budget of $350,000, less than half of the budget of a typical hour of prime time programming at the time.

Our World premiered to indifferent critical response but as the program progressed critics became effusive with their praise. Despite being critically well received and profitable for the network, Our World performed poorly in the Nielsen ratings, as its first half-hour was programmed against the extremely popular The Cosby Show. ABC canceled the show after one season. Ellerbee tried to move the program to PBS but was unsuccessful.

Production
Our World was created by ABC News president Roone Arledge. The show had its genesis in a 1985 ABC News special called 45/85, a three-hour documentary that reviewed post-World War II history with an emphasis on the Cold War. That special was produced by Avram "Av" Westin, who also produced Our World. Anchors Ellerbee and Gandolf co-wrote Our World, which combined archival footage with new interviews with people who participated in or witnessed the events. Initial plans were that each episode would cover one year, but that idea was quickly scrapped; Ellerbee said, "It's hard enough to do a month, or even days."

ABC hired Ellerbee away from NBC to co-anchor the show. The network considered Sander Vanocur, Dick Schaap and James Wooten as possible partners before selecting Gandolf, at the time the sports anchor for ABC's World News Saturday and World News Sunday.

Set designers modeled the set for Our World after a corner news stand. For each episode, artifacts of the period being profiled, including magazines and political posters, decorated the set and a movie marquee listed the title of a film that was in theatres of the time. In the foreground was placed an Our World newspaper the headlines of which were the program's title and the name of that program's producer.

Each episode cost $350,000 to produce as compared to the then-typical $800,000 cost of an hour of prime time network programming. The low budget combined with a dozen commercial spots sold at $35,000 each meant that Our World generated an estimated $4 million in profit for ABC during its original run and summer repeats.

Our World producers selected each episode's subject time period with the help of consultants from the Smithsonian Institution and Columbia University. The show was limited in its choices by the available footage for the given time period. Ellerbee recalled a viewer-submitted proposal for an episode on the American Civil War, which could not be made because of the non-existence of archive footage from the 1860s and the lack of any living eyewitnesses.

Episode list
Reruns occasionally occurred in between new episodes.

Critical and popular response
Critical response to Our World was overall very favorable. Reviews of the premiere episode, however, were somewhat tepid, with The New York Times saying "There are worse ways to spend an hour" and calling the show "a pleasant hour", while pointing to segments such as an interview with "a man, who, 17 years ago, slept in the house next door to a house struck by the Manson gang", as "not terribly interesting." The Los Angeles Times was harsher, calling the debut "rather bland". While praising anchors Ellerbee and Gandolf, calling them "refreshing [and] off-center, running against the TV mainstream, making words, not whoopee", the Times ultimately felt that "Our World offers no sense of who we really were in 1969 because, typical of TV, it renders everything equal."

With subsequent episodes, reviews improved. The Boston Globe, comparing its debut episode ("a gloppy nostalgia trip that presented history the way MTV presents rock, in digestible, unrelated, bland bite-sized bits") to an episode airing less than five months later, found it "light years ahead in terms of wit, style and historical perspective. It is still easily digestible, but there's nothing bland about it." The St. Petersburg Times said of the show, "It educated, but it was not school. It entertained, but it was not mindless. It was quality - television's noblest service." The San Diego Union concurred, citing Our World as "the most refreshing, fascinating and innovative history series ever on TV".

Popular response was much less effusive. The show averaged 9 million viewers per episode, as compared to The Cosby Show, which garnered an average 63 million viewers per week. Our World was the lowest rated prime time show of the 104 that aired during the 1986-7 television season, bringing in only a 6.5/10 rating/share. One segment of the public who responded very favorably to the program was teachers, who assigned Our World as homework. ABC created a study guide for the show, mailing out some 39,000 copies a month to educators and fans.

Gandolf, Ellerbee and Richard Gerdau won Emmy Awards for Outstanding Individual Achievement in News and Documentary Programming (writing) for the episode "Halloween 1938".

Cancellation and PBS
ABC canceled Our World after its first season, replacing it with the situation comedies Sledge Hammer! and The Charmings. Ellerbee and Gandolf learned that the show had been canceled from a segment on Entertainment Tonight. Ellerbee sharply criticized ABC for the cancellation, saying "If they had left it there for three to four years, it could have done what 60 Minutes did, which went against the Disney juggernaut on NBC. It could have developed slowly as an alternative program without being in the ratings race." The advocacy group Viewers for Quality Television mounted a letter-writing campaign to save the show – similar to campaigns that had saved Designing Women and Cagney and Lacey – and generated some 20,000 letters of support,  but the campaign was unsuccessful.

PBS expressed interest in obtaining the show. Although ABC asserted rights to the name "Our World," Ellerbee said "We never liked that title to begin with" and stated that the name "Your World" was under consideration. Ellerbee planned to co-produce the show through her production company, Lucky Duck Productions, in partnership with WNET. Ultimately, Ellerbee was unable to secure the estimated $5 million needed to produce the first season of 13 episodes and Our World did not make the transition to PBS.

In 1988, CBS tried to revive the format of Our World with a television pilot called Try to Remember. Anchored by veteran newscaster Charles Kuralt, Try to Remember covered August 11–17, 1969, echoing Our Worlds pilot coverage of the summer of 1969. The show aired on Thursday, June 23. Try to Remember did not get picked up as a regular program.

References

Other sources
Arledge, Roone (2004). Roone: A Memoir. New York, HarperCollins. .

External links

1986 American television series debuts
1987 American television series endings
1980s American documentary television series
American Broadcasting Company original programming
ABC News
1980s American television news shows